This article provides a list of scientific, nationwide public opinion polls that were conducted relating to the 1940 United States presidential election.

Presidential election

Franklin Roosevelt vs Wendell Willkie

Franklin Roosevelt vs Bruce Barton

Franklin Roosevelt vs Thomas Dewey

Franklin Roosevelt vs Herbert Hoover

Franklin Roosevelt vs Alf Landon

Franklin Roosevelt vs Robert Taft

Franklin Roosevelt vs Arthur Vandenberg

James Farley vs Thomas Dewey

James Farley vs Robert Taft

James Farley vs Arthur Vandenberg

John Garner vs Thomas Dewey

John Garner vs Robert Taft

John Garner vs Arthur Vandenberg

Harry Hopkins vs Thomas Dewey

Cordell Hull vs Thomas Dewey

Cordell Hull vs Robert Taft

Cordell Hull vs Arthur Vandenberg

Cordell Hull vs Wendell Willkie

Paul McNutt vs Robert Taft

Paul McNutt vs Arthur Vandenberg

Paul McNutt vs Wendell Willkie

Henry Wallace vs Thomas Dewey

Henry Wallace vs Robert Taft

Franklin Roosevelt vs Thomas Dewey vs John Garner

Polling for the Republican Presidential Nomination

Polling for the Democratic Presidential Nomination

Notes

References

1940 United States presidential election